Devonport City may refer:

 Devonport City FC, an Australian soccer team
 City of Devonport, the local government of the city of Devonport, Australia
 Devonport, Tasmania, a city in Australia